Grey Badger II (1941– 1972) was a noted Quarter Horse match racer and sire in the early days of the American Quarter Horse Association or AQHA.

Life

Grey Badger II foaled on May 5, 1941. He was registered with number 2006 in the AQHA. His stud book listing gives his color as gray, and his breeder as Walter F. Merrick of Texola, Oklahoma. His sire was Midnight Jr #210, and his dam was listed as Grey Annie #3502 by Billy the Tough, second dam as Casey Jones mare by Casey Jones. He was owned by Chick Crisp of Sayre, Oklahoma at the time he was registered. His sire was a son of Midnight and traced to Peter McCue three times. His dam traced to Peter McCue two more times, making Grey Badger II inbred to Peter McCue, with five crosses.

Racing career 
Grey Badger II was a noted match racer during the 1940s. His official racing record with the AQHA has him starting six times in three years, with two wins and no seconds or thirds. He achieved an AA speed rating.

Breeding record 
Among his famous offspring were Grey Badger III and Badger's Grey. His granddaughter Triangle Tookie is a leading producer of AQHA Champions, including Two Eyed Jack.

Death and honors 
Grey Badger II died on the Triangle Ranch in Texas, probably around 1972.

Grey Badger II was inducted into the AQHA Hall of Fame in 2007.

Pedigree

Notes

References

 All Breed Pedigree Database Pedigree of Grey Badger II retrieved on June 23, 2007
 AQHA Hall of Fame accessed on September 11, 2017

External links
 Grey Badger II at Foundation Horses
 Grey Badger II at Quarter Horse Directory
 Grey Badger II at Quarter Horse Legends

Racehorses bred in the United States
American Quarter Horse racehorses
Racehorses trained in the United States
American Quarter Horse sires
1941 racehorse births
1972 racehorse deaths
AQHA Hall of Fame (horses)